Mulia is a Southeast Asian surname. Notable people with the surname include:

Jonathan Mulia (born 1986), Indonesian actor 
Pandikar Amin Mulia, Malaysian politician
Shinta Mulia Sari (born 1988), Indonesian-born Singaporean badminton player
Siti Musdah Mulia, Indonesian women's rights activist